Hello Lonesome is an 2010 American comedy drama directed by Adam Reid. It won numerous awards including at the Los Angeles Film Festival and the Bahamas International Film Festival. It was also nominated for a Film Independent Spirit Award.

Plot
Hello Lonesome follows three different story lines that show the difficulties of making and maintaining human bonds.

The first story line is of Bill (played by Harry Chase), who lives alone in an apartment and is attempting to connect with his estranged daughter. The second is of Eleanor (played by Lynn Cohen), a widow who befriends Gary (played by James Urbaniak) after she loses her driver's license and needs to him to drive her places. The third is of Gordon (played by Nate Smith), who begins a relationship with Debbie (played by Sabrina Lloyd) after meeting through an online dating service.

Cast
 Sabrina Lloyd as Debbie
 James Urbaniak as Gary
 Lynn Cohen as Eleanor
 Harry Chase as Bill
 Nate Smith as Gordon
 Kamel Boutros as Omar
 Cathy Trien as Tabitha
 Dave K. Williams as Dean

Production

Hello Lonesome is the first major directorial for Reid who previously produced shorts and commercials through his production agency Bodega Studios. The film was financed by Reid and shot on a budget of $50,000 and completed in 15 days.

Release and awards

Hello Lonesome was released at major film festivals internationally. It won numerous awards including at the Los Angeles Film Festival and the Bahamas International Film Festival. Hello Lonesome was also nominated for a Film Independent Spirit Award.

References

External links
 

2010 films
2010 comedy-drama films
American comedy-drama films
2010s English-language films
2010s American films